Salamiou is a village in the Paphos District of Cyprus, located 6 km northeast of Kelokedara.

References

Communities in Paphos District